The following television stations broadcast on digital channel 16 in the United States:

 K16AB-D in Guymon, Oklahoma
 K16AE-D in Gillette, Wyoming
 K16AZ-D in Glasgow, Montana
 K16BO-D in Milford, etc., Utah
 K16BQ-D in Brainerd, Minnesota, on virtual channel 16, which rebroadcasts KSAX
 K16BP-D in Cottonwood, Arizona, on virtual channel 45, which rebroadcasts KUTP
 K16BT-D in Orderville, Utah
 K16BZ-D in Ruidoso, New Mexico
 K16CG-D in St. James, Minnesota
 K16CH-D in Raton, New Mexico
 K16CO-D in Alexandria, Minnesota, on virtual channel 16
 K16CS-D in Pinedale, etc., Wyoming
 K16CT-D in Cortez, etc., Colorado
 K16DH-D in Miles City, Montana
 K16DL-D in Zuni Pueblo, New Mexico
 K16DR-D in Jack's Cabin, Colorado, on virtual channel 13, which rebroadcasts K13AV-D
 K16DS-D in St. George, Utah, on virtual channel 8, which rebroadcasts KCSG
 K16DX-D in Gage, Oklahoma
 K16DZ-D in Hardin, Montana
 K16EJ-D in Peetz, Colorado, on virtual channel 47, which rebroadcasts K21NZ-D
 K16EK-D in Idalia, Colorado, on virtual channel 4, which rebroadcasts KCNC-TV
 K16EM-D in Prineville, etc., Oregon
 K16ET-D in Pleasant Valley, Colorado, on virtual channel 4, which rebroadcasts KCNC-TV
 K16EV-D in Bullhead City, Arizona
 K16EX-D in Clovis, New Mexico
 K16FC-D in San Luis Obispo, California
 K16FD-D in Battle Mountain, Nevada
 K16FS-D in Woody Creek, Colorado
 K16FU-D in Mina/Luning, Nevada
 K16FV-D in Ryndon, Nevada
 K16GJ-D in Polson, Montana
 K16GM-D in Yerington, Nevada
 K16GP-D in Circle, Montana
 K16GZ-D in Durango, Colorado
 K16HD-D in Green River, Utah
 K16HI-D in Navajo Mountain, Utah
 K16HJ-D in Oljeto, Utah
 K16HK-D in Mexican Hat, Utah
 K16HV-D in Mayfield, Utah
 K16HW-D in Evanston, etc., Wyoming
 K16IB-D in Mount Pleasant, Utah, on virtual channel 9, which rebroadcasts KUEN
 K16IC-D in Park Rapids, Minnesota, on virtual channel 16
 K16IE-D in Coos Bay, Oregon
 K16II-D in Hilldale, Utah
 K16IO-D in Chugwater, Wyoming
 K16IR-D in Sayre, Oklahoma
 K16IS-D in Pittsburg, Kansas
 K16IW-D in Redding, California
 K16IX-D in Preston, Idaho, on virtual channel 8, which rebroadcasts KIFI-TV
 K16IZ-D in Eureka, Nevada
 K16JD-D in Northome, Minnesota, on virtual channel 13, which rebroadcasts WIRT-DT
 K16JE-D in Glenns Ferry, Idaho
 K16JJ-D in Eureka, California
 K16JS-D in Eugene, Oregon
 K16JW-D in Ridgecrest, California, on virtual channel 41, which rebroadcasts K31MB-D
 K16JZ-D in McDermitt, Nevada
 K16KA-D in Pueblo, Colorado
 K16KB-D in Conrad, Montana
 K16KE-D in Baudette, Minnesota
 K16KI-D in Bend, Oregon
 K16KM-D in Bemidji, Minnesota, on virtual channel 16
 K16KO-D in Leadore, Idaho
 K16KZ-D in Quartz Creek, etc., Montana
 K16LB-D in Yucca Valley, California, on virtual channel 9, which rebroadcasts KCAL-TV
 K16LF-D in Eads, etc., Colorado
 K16LG-D in Lund & Preston, Nevada
 K16LI-D in Port Orford, Oregon
 K16LM-D in Teton Village, Wyoming
 K16LN-D in Pendleton, Oregon
 K16LP-D in Paradise, California
 K16LQ-D in Seiling, Oklahoma
 K16LR-D in Artesia, New Mexico
 K16LS-D in Grangeville, etc., Idaho
 K16LT-D in Dubois, etc., Wyoming
 K16LU-D in Caballo, New Mexico
 K16LV-D in Grays River, Washington
 K16LX-D in Juliaetta, Idaho
 K16LY-D in Childress, Texas
 K16LZ-D in Rural Garfield County, Utah
 K16MA-D in Frost, Minnesota
 K16MB-D in Hatch, Utah
 K16MC-D in Rural Sevier County, Utah
 K16MD-D in Teasdale/Torrey, Utah
 K16ME-D in Richfield, etc., Utah, on virtual channel 5, which rebroadcasts KSL-TV
 K16MF-D in Koosharem, Utah
 K16MG-D in Panguitch, Utah
 K16MH-D in Henrieville, Utah
 K16MK-D in Laketown, etc., Utah, on virtual channel 11, which rebroadcasts KBYU-TV
 K16ML-D in Corvallis, Oregon
 K16MM-D in Circleville, Utah
 K16MN-D in Wendover, Utah
 K16MR-D in Gateway, Colorado
 K16MS-D in Cedar City, Utah, on virtual channel 4, which rebroadcasts KTVX
 K16MT-D in Leamington, Utah
 K16MU-D in Scipio, Utah
 K16MW-D in Malad City, Idaho
 K16MX-D in Myton, Utah
 K16MY-D in Ashland, Montana
 K16MZ-D in Orangeville, Utah, on virtual channel 4, which rebroadcasts KTVX
 K16NA-D in Price, Utah
 K16NB-D in Ely & McGill, Nevada
 K16NC-D in Fruitland, Utah
 K16NE-D in Forsyth, Montana
 K16NF-D in Hot Springs, Montana
 K16NH-D in Wray, Colorado, on virtual channel 20, which rebroadcasts KTVD
 K16NJ-D in Anton, Colorado, on virtual channel 6
 K16NK-D in Cave Junction, Oregon
 K16NN-D in Laredo, Texas
 K16NQ-D in Pocatello, Idaho
 K16NS-D in Redstone, Colorado
 K16NU-D in Mountain View, etc., Wyoming
 K23KB-D in Nephi, Utah, on virtual channel 5, which rebroadcasts KSL-TV
 K33JN-D in Montezuma Creek & Aneth, Utah
 K33JO-D in Bluff & area, Utah
 K40IS-D in Cottage Grove, Oregon
 K43JV in Provo, Utah, on virtual channel 43
 K46FY-D in Redwood Falls, Minnesota, on virtual channel 16
 KADN-TV in Lafayette, Louisiana
 KADT-LD in Austin, Texas
 KAJL-LD in Fayetteville, Arkansas
 KBGS-TV in Billings, Montana
 KBTX-TV in Bryan, Texas
 KCGE-DT in Crookston, Minnesota
 KCLO-TV in Rapid City, South Dakota
 KCWC-DT in Thermopolis, Wyoming
 KCWC-DT in Lander, Wyoming
 KDSM-TV in Des Moines, Iowa
 KDTF-LD in San Diego, California, on virtual channel 36
 KEMS in Vernal, Utah
 KEVO-LD in Reno, Nevada
 KFFV in Seattle, Washington, on virtual channel 44
 KFXV in Harlingen, Texas
 KHCE-TV in San Antonio, Texas
 KHRR in Tucson, Arizona
 KHSC-LD in Fresno, California
 KINC in Las Vegas, Nevada
 KJNB-LD in Jonesboro, Arkansas
 KKIC-LD in Boise, Idaho
 KKTQ-LD in Cheyenne, Wyoming
 KMJF-LD in Columbus, Nebraska
 KNDO in Yakima, Washington
 KOAB-TV in Madras, Oregon
 KOCM in Norman, Oklahoma
 KOGG in Wailuku, Hawaii
 KOOD in Hays, Kansas
 KORS-CD in Portland, Oregon, an ATSC 3.0 station, on virtual channel 16
 KORX-CD in Walla Walla, Washington
 KOZK in Springfield, Missouri
 KPHE-LD in Phoenix, Arizona, on virtual channel 44
 KPIC in Roseburg, Oregon
 KPTB-DT in Lubbock, Texas
 KPXH-LD in Fort Collins, Colorado
 KPXM-TV in St. Cloud, Minnesota, on virtual channel 41
 KQDK-CD in Denver, Colorado, on virtual channel 33, which rebroadcasts KQCK
 KSAN-TV in San Angelo, Texas
 KSHV-TV in Shreveport, Louisiana
 KSXE-LD in Sioux City, Iowa
 KTFQ-TV in Albuquerque, New Mexico
 KTKA-TV in Topeka, Kansas
 KTSM-TV in El Paso, Texas
 KTWM-LD in Lawton, Oklahoma
 KULU-LD in Park City, Utah, on virtual channel 10, which rebroadcasts KULX-CD
 KUNP in La Grande, Oregon
 KVAD-LD in Amarillo, Texas
 KVTH-DT in Hot Springs, Arkansas
 KWHB in Tulsa, Oklahoma
 KXCC-LD in Corpus Christi, Texas
 W16CC-D in West Gate, Florida, on virtual channel 16
 W16CL-D in Key West, Florida
 W16CW-D in Villalba, Puerto Rico, on virtual channel 16
 W16CX-D in Panama City, Florida
 W16DN-D in Traverse City, Michigan
 W16DQ-D in Tampa, Florida, on virtual channel 43
 W16DS-D in Birmingham, Alabama
 W16DU-D in Bloomington, Wisconsin
 W16DV-D in Alexander City, Alabama
 W16DX-D in Aguada, Puerto Rico, on virtual channel 54, which rebroadcasts WCCV-TV
 W16DZ-D in Tyron, North Carolina
 W16EB-D in Augusta, Kentucky, on virtual channel 38, which rebroadcasts WKMR
 W16EE-D in Augusta, Georgia
 W16EJ-D in Harrisburg, Pennsylvania
 W16EK-D in Lenox, Georgia
 W16EL-D in Augusta, Georgia
 W41DK-D in Keyser, West Virginia, on virtual channel 24, which rebroadcasts WNPB-TV
 WAAA-LD in Valparaiso, Indiana, on virtual channel 49
 WALE-LD in Montgomery, Alabama
 WANA-LD in Naples, Florida
 WAPK-CD in Bristol, Virginia/Kingsport, Tennessee
 WBKI in Salem, Indiana
 WCJB-TV in Gainesville, Florida
 WCPB in Salisbury, Maryland
 WCWG in Lexington, North Carolina, uses WXII-TV's spectrum
 WDMA-CD in Macon, Georgia
 WDNI-CD in Indianapolis, Indiana, on virtual channel 19
 WDRH-LD in Raleigh, North Carolina, on virtual channel 16
 WDUM-LD in Philadelphia, Pennsylvania, on virtual channel 41
 WEID-LD in South Bend, Indiana
 WELF-TV in Dalton, Georgia
 WEZK-LD in Knoxville, Tennessee
 WFFF-TV in Burlington, Vermont
 WFNY-CD in Gloversville, New York
 WFWC-CD in Fort Wayne, Indiana
 WHMR-LD in Homestead, Florida
 WHTN in Murfreesboro, Tennessee, on virtual channel 39
 WINP-TV in Pittsburgh, Pennsylvania, on virtual channel 16
 WJFW-TV in Rhinelander, Wisconsin
 WJHG-TV in Panama City, Florida
 WJPM-TV in Florence, South Carolina
 WKDC-LD in Columbia, South Carolina
 WLOV-TV in West Point, Mississippi
 WMAH-TV in Biloxi, Mississippi
 WNBJ-LD in Jackson, Tennessee
 WNYO-TV in Buffalo, New York, an ATSC 3.0 station
 WNYS-CD in Ithaca, New York
 WOBC-CD in Battle Creek, Michigan
 WOSU-TV in Columbus, Ohio, on virtual channel 34
 WPBF in Tequesta, Florida
 WPXA-TV in Rome, Georgia, on virtual channel 14
 WPXU-TV in Jacksonville, North Carolina
 WPYM-LD in Little Rock, Arkansas
 WRAP-LD in Cleveland, Ohio
 WRCF-CD in Orlando, Florida, on virtual channel 29
 WRDP-LD in Columbus, Georgia
 WRSP-TV in Springfield, Illinois
 WRUA in Fajardo, Puerto Rico, on virtual channel 33, which rebroadcasts WECN
 WSAV-TV in Savannah, Georgia
 WSMH in Flint, Michigan
 WTKR in Norfolk, Virginia
 WTOM-TV in Cheboygan, Michigan
 WTVO in Rockford, Illinois
 WUSV-LD in Clarksburg, West Virginia
 WVAW-LD in Charlottesville, Virginia
 WWPI-LD in Presque Isle, Maine
 WWWN-LD in Memphis, Tennessee
 WWYA-LD in Honea Path, South Carolina, on virtual channel 28
 WXII-TV in Winston-Salem, North Carolina
 WYTU-LD in Milwaukee, Wisconsin, on virtual channel 63
 WZLH-LD in Syracuse, New York
 WZTS-LD in Hinton, West Virginia

The following stations, which are no longer licensed, formerly broadcast on digital channel 16:
 K16CP-D in Granite Falls, Minnesota
 K16HP-D in East Wenatchee, Washington
 K16HQ-D in Georgetown, Idaho
 K16IG-D in Cottage Grove, Oregon
 K16JC-D in Beaumont, Texas
 KIMD-LD in Lufkin, Texas
 W16CV-D in Parkersburg, West Virginia
 WEPA-CD in Pittsburgh, Pennsylvania
 WKMH-LD in Peoria, Illinois
 WMKH-LD in Hilton Head Island, South Carolina

References

16 digital